Antifragile is the second extended play by South Korean girl group Le Sserafim, released by Source Music on October 17, 2022. It contains five tracks, including the lead single of the same name. Antifragile marks their first release as a quintet, following the departure of Kim Ga-ram in July 2022.

Background and release 
On September 1, it was revealed that Le Sserafim would be making their first comeback with new music in the fall. Through a short video clip published on September 19, Le Sserafim announced the title and release date of their upcoming extended play (EP). Source Music then shared the EP's physical release details on social media platforms. Three sets of concept photos titled "Midnight Onyx", "Iridescent Opal" and "Frozen Aquamarine" were also revealed in the weeks leading up to the release of Antifragile. The track samplers and track list were released on October 3 and 4, respectively. The music video for the lead single was released prior to the EP.

Composition 
The EP contains five songs, including the lead single of the same name, "Antifragile". Member Huh Yun-jin participated in the songwriting process of the third, fourth, and fifth tracks. In addition, member Sakura participated in writing and composing the fifth track. 

The record opens with "bass-heavy" intro, "The Hydra". The track references a "mythological creature", where each member speaks in their native language. The second track, "Antifragile", is described as an "Afro-Latin style" pop song with a "heavy" Latin rhythm. The lyrics of the song convey the message that difficult times are stimulus for growth and that with this mindset, they will become stronger. It is followed by "Impurities", which is described as a "sophisticated" R&B track. The fourth track, "No Celestial", is a punk-pop song, characterized with heavy guitar sound. The lyrics are "all about embracing their flaws". The closing track "Good Parts (When the Quality Is Bad but I Am)", is another R&B track, where the members sing about finding "true courage in embracing one's flaws".

Commercial performance and reception 
Following the commencement of pre-orders on September 19, the album sold more than 400,000 copies within a week. As of October 6, Antifragile had sold 560,000 copies, and as of October 14, it surpassed 600,000 copies.

Promotion 
On the day Antifragile was released, Le Sserafim hosted a live showcase on Mnet to introduce the extended play and to communicate with their fans. "Antifragile", "Impurities", "No Celestial", and "Good Parts (When the Quality Is Bad but I Am)" were all performed at the showcase.

Track listing 
All tracks except for track 5 (produced by Sir Nolan and Alex Bilowitz) are produced by 13 (Score, Megatone).

Credits and personnel 

 Score (13) – writing (all tracks), production (tracks 1–4)
 Megatone (13) – writing (all tracks), production (tracks 1–4)
 Alex Bilowitz –  writing (track 5), production (track 5)
 Sir Nolan –  writing (track 5), production (track 5)
 Blvsh – writing (track 3)
 Cazzi Opeia – writing (track 4)
 Charli Taft – writing (track 3)
 Cha Yubin – writing (track 5)
 Cho Yoon Kyung – writing (track 5)
 Daniel "Obi" Klein – writing (track 3)
 Danke – writing (tracks 2–5)
 Ellen Berg – writing (track 4)
 Hayes Kramer – writing (track 3)
 "Hitman" Bang – writing (tracks 2, 3)
 Huh Yun-jin – writing (tracks 3–5)
 Hybe Labels – writing (track 1)
 Isabella Lovestory – writing (track 2)
 Jaro – writing (track 3)
 Jenna Andrews – writing (track 5)
 Jonna Hall – writing (track 3)
 Julia Bognar Finnseter (track 4)
 Kim Chae-ah – writing (track 3)
 Kim In-hyung – writing (track 4)
 Kyler Niko – writing (track 2)
 Lee Hyung-seok – writing (track 3)
 Maggie Szabo – writing (track 3)
 Nathalie Boone – writing (track 2)
 Nermin Harambašić – writing (track 4)
 Nikolay Mohr – writing (track 3)
 Park Sang-yu – writing (track 3)
 Paulina Cerrilla – writing (track 2)
 Poutyface – writing (track 4)
 Ronnie Icon – writing (track 2)
 Sakura Miyawaki – writing (track 5)
 Salem Ilese – writing (track 5)
 Shintaro Yasuda – writing (track 2)
 Shorelle – writing (track 4)
 Supreme Boi – writing (track 1)
 YoungChance – writing (track 4)
 Kim Ha-nul – assistant direction
 Jeong Ji-won – assistant direction
 Nu Kiml – creative direction
 Atu – direction
 Gabriel Cho – visual creative
 Moon Sung-woong – visual creative
 Cho Yoon – visual creative
 Kim Yu-joo – visual creative

Charts

Weekly charts

Monthly charts

Year-end charts

Sales and certifications

Release history

References

2022 EPs
Hybe Corporation EPs
Korean-language EPs
Le Sserafim albums